Hajji Musa (also Romanized as Ḩājī Mūsá and Ḩājjī Mūsá) is a village in Saral Rural District, Saral District, Divandarreh County, Kurdistan Province, Iran. At the 2006 census, its population was 113, in 26 families. The village is populated by Kurds.

References 

Towns and villages in Divandarreh County
Kurdish settlements in Kurdistan Province